The enzyme MHETase is a hydrolase, which was discovered in 2016. It cleaves 2-hydroxyethyl terephthalic acid, the PET degradation product by PETase, to ethylene glycol and terephthalic acid. This pair of enzymes, PETase and MHETase, enable the bacterium Ideonella sakaiensis to live on the plastic PET as sole carbon source.

Chemical reaction 
The first enzyme of the PET degradation pathway, PETase, cleaves this plastic into the intermediates MHET (Mono-(2-hydroxyethyl)terephthalic acid) and minor amounts BHET (Bis-(2-hydroxyethyl)terephthalic acid). MHETase hydrolyses the ester bond of MHET forming terephthalic acid and ethylene glycol. 

Besides its natural substrate MHET the chromogenic substrate MpNPT, Mono-p-nitrophenyl-terephthalate, is also hydrolyzed well. This can be used to measure the enzymatic activity and determine the kinetic parameters. Ferulate and gallate esters, substrates of the closest relatives in the tannase family, are not converted. p-Nitrophenyl ester of aliphatic monocarboxylic acids like the widely used esterase substrate p-nitrophenyl acetate are not hydrolyzed either.

The native enzyme is incapable of working on BHET, mono(2-hydroxyethyl)-isophthalate (MHEI), or mono(2-hydroxyethyl)-furanoate (MHEF). MHEI is a likely industrial PET degradation product due to the use of isophthalate comonomer. MHEF is a product of PEF degradation by PETase. Protein engineering research aims to overcome these barriers.

Structure 
The structure of MHETase was solved in 2019. It shows the common fold of the alpha/beta hydrolase superfamily. According to the classification in the ESTHER database, MHETase belongs to the family of tannases within block X.  This family mainly contains tannases und feruloyl esterases. The enzyme consists of two domains: the hydrolase domain harbors the catalytic residues Ser225, His528 and Asp492; the lid domain contributes most of the residues of the substrate binding site.

External links 
 ESTHER Datenbank

References 

Hydrolases